Get the Picture? is the second album by the English rock group Pretty Things, released in 1965.

Recording 
Recording began on the Pretty Things' second album in around September 1965, just months after the release of their debut. It ended up being a haphazard affair thanks to a growing problem with drummer Viv Prince whose behaviour was becoming ever more erratic and reckless. With Prince being unreliable, the band had help in the form of producer Bobby Graham who was a renowned drummer in his own right, playing on several tracks. John Stax's flatmate John C. Alder helped out on at least two tracks, one of which was "You'll Never Do It Baby". Jimmy Page, then a prominent session musician, was occasionally involved in the recordings, receiving a partial writing credit on "You Don't Believe Me." The album did see the band starting to move away from the staunch R&B direction that dominated the first album, exploring more soulful areas as well as Freakbeat with much use of distortion on guitar and bass parts.

Recorded on three-track tape at Philips Studios in London, the album was only mixed in mono. By the time it was released, Viv Prince had been fired from the band. It left them without a drummer for a few weeks whilst the search was on for a replacement.

The liner notes were written by Bryan Morrison.

1966 film 
Throughout 1965 there had been talk in the music press that the band would make a movie. However, this project was delayed until there was stability in the lineup when Skip Alan replaced Viv Prince on drums. An idea by manager Bryan Morrison to act as a promotional tool, the end result was shot during one week in and around London in January 1966. Its working title was "A Day in the Life of the Pretty Things."

Clocking in at 14 minutes, the black-and-white film contained no dialogue. It opens with the band playing "Me Needing You" which is artfully treated behind the opening titles. There is then a sequence set in a recording studio showing the band supposedly recording "Midnight To Six Man." All recordings heard in the film were the original studio recordings though some new bass parts were added to a couple of songs with less than successful results. Bryan Morrison features in the studio sequence as well as the following sequence for "Can't Stand the Pain." A rather Beatle-esque affair this featured Morrison frogmarching the band around the world before the band rebel, leaving him to fly off on a plane, during which they cavort around London. Bryan escapes by parachute and a lengthy chase sequence takes place. Bryan recaptures the band after falling over, revealing his suitcase full of foreign currency.

The scene changes to the 100 Club, with footage of the fans outside waiting to go indoors where they witness a performance of "L.S.D." Though dubbed, the footage is genuinely live, capturing the sweaty raw excitement of the band on stage at a regular haunt.

An EP entitled The Pretty Things on Film consisting of the songs featured was released by Fontana, but it failed to get much exposure. It was shown in one cinema in London for a couple of weeks, but ended up generally unseen until Snapper included it as a multimedia bonus on their CD reissue of Get the Picture?

Most of the members enjoyed making the movie. Brian Pendleton was an exception, hating the film's director and pointing out that the band themselves – and not Bryan Morrison – ended up paying for the whole movie, feeling it was a wasted opportunity and investment since money was tight for the band.

Track listing 
 "You Don't Believe Me" (Phil May, Bobby Graham, Jimmy Page, Willie Morrell) – 2:24
 "Buzz the Jerk" (May, Dick Taylor) – 1:55
 "Get the Picture?" (May, Taylor) – 1:56
 "Can't Stand the Pain" (May, Taylor, Graham) – 2:42
 "Rainin' in My Heart" (James Moore, Jerry West) – 2:33
 "We'll Play House" (May, Taylor) – 2:34
 "You'll Never Do It, Baby" (Brian Smith, Terry Fox) – 2:29
 "I Had a Dream" (Jimmy Witherspoon) – 2:59
 "I Want Your Love" (Johnnie Dee, Johnny Tarr) – 2:18
 "London Town" (Tim Hardin) – 2:28
 "Cry to Me" (Bert Russell) – 2:53
 "Gonna Find Me a Substitute" (Ike Turner) – 2:59

Bonus tracks on CD reissue
 "Get a Buzz" (May, Taylor, Brian Pendleton, John Stax, Skip Alan)– 4:02
 "Sittin' All Alone" (May, Taylor) – 2:49
 "Midnight to Six Man" (Taylor, May) – 2:21
 "Me Needing You" (May, Taylor) – 1:58
 "Come See Me" (Pierre Tubbs, J.J. Jackson, Sidney Barnes) – 2:41
 "L.S.D." (May, Taylor) – 2:27
 Multimedia Bonus Track – The Pretty Things 1966 movie

"Midnight To Six Man", "Me Needing You", "Come See Me" and "L.S.D." were produced by Glyn Johns.

Personnel 
The Pretty Things
Phil May – vocals
Dick Taylor – lead guitar
Brian Pendleton – rhythm guitar, backing vocals
John Stax – bass, backing vocals
Viv Prince – drums (on a handful of tracks)
Bobby Graham – drums (on a handful of tracks)
Twink – drums (on two tracks)

On the bonus tracks, the lineup was May, Taylor, Pendleton, Stax and Skip Alan on drums.

References 

1965 albums
Pretty Things albums
Albums produced by Glyn Johns
Fontana Records albums
Albums produced by Bobby Graham
Philips Records albums
Repertoire Records albums
Sundazed Records albums
Norton Records albums
Victor Entertainment albums